Olga Wehrly (born 1978 or 1979) is an Irish actor and voiceover artist.

Background
Wehrly is from Ransboro, County Sligo. She joined the Mary McDonagh School of Dance at the age of three and later studied drama under Damien Quinn. Wehrly attended University College Dublin where she studied arts but did not complete her degree.

Career
In 2005, Wehrly featured in a television ad for Kerrygold butter directed by Lenny Abrahamson. Later that year she made her television series debut guest starring in Raidió Teilifís Éireann drama The Clinic. Her theatre credits include Othello (2007) and Macbeth (2008) with the Second Age Theatre Company and Penelope with the Druid Theatre Company.

Personal life
Wehrly has a daughter named Úna. Wehrly contracted COVID-19 in December 2020 and developed long COVID.

Filmography

References

External links 
 

21st-century Irish actresses
20th-century Irish actresses
Living people
Irish film actresses
Irish television actresses
Year of birth missing (living people)